Chaima Midi (born 1 February 1996) is an Algerian karateka. She won the gold medal in the women's 61 kg event at the 2019 African Games held in Rabat, Morocco. She also won one of the bronze medals in the women's team kumite event at the 2019 African Games.

Career 

She won the silver medal in her event at the 2019 African Karate Championships held in Gaborone, Botswana. She also won one of the bronze medals in the women's team kumite event.

In June 2021, she competed at the World Olympic Qualification Tournament held in Paris, France hoping to qualify for the 2020 Summer Olympics in Tokyo, Japan.  In November 2021, she competed in the women's 61 kg event at the World Karate Championships held in Dubai, United Arab Emirates.

She won the gold medal in the women's 61 kg event at the 2022 Mediterranean Games held in Oran, Algeria. In the final, she defeated Wafa Mahjoub of Tunisia.

Achievements

References

External links 
 

Living people
1996 births
Place of birth missing (living people)
Algerian female karateka
African Games medalists in karate
African Games gold medalists for Algeria
African Games bronze medalists for Algeria
Competitors at the 2019 African Games
Competitors at the 2022 Mediterranean Games
Mediterranean Games medalists in karate
Mediterranean Games gold medalists for Algeria
21st-century Algerian women